Jean-François Bell (born October 6, 1981) is a retired Cameroonian football (soccer) defender.

Playing career
During his career, Bell played for Étoile Carouge FC, AC Bellinzona, BSC Young Boys, FC Vaduz, FC Wil 1900, Tonnerre Yaoundé, Urania Genève Sport and FC Plan-les-Ouates.

External links

1981 births
Living people
Cameroonian footballers
Étoile Carouge FC players
AC Bellinzona players
BSC Young Boys players
FC Wil players
Tonnerre Yaoundé players
Urania Genève Sport players
Association football defenders